Adam Stanisław Papée (21 July 1895 – 6 March 1990) was a Polish fencing champion, one of pioneers of fencing in Poland.

Papée was not only a sportsman, but also an official, one of founders of the Polish Fencing Association (Polski Związek Szermierczy). Between 1926 and 1930, he was the director of this association.

He was four times individual champion of Poland (1926, 1927, 1929, 1932), and four times took part in the Summer Olympic Games (1924–1936), winning two bronze medals in team sabre, in Amsterdam (1928) and Los Angeles (1932). He fenced for two clubs - AZS Kraków and Legia Warszawa. After retirement from active sports, he became a coach, also wrote memoirs Na białą broń, published in 1987.

References

External links
 Adam Papee's bio on the Polish Olympic Committee webpage

1895 births
1990 deaths
Sportspeople from Lviv
People from the Kingdom of Galicia and Lodomeria
Polish Austro-Hungarians
Polish male fencers
Olympic fencers of Poland
Fencers at the 1924 Summer Olympics
Fencers at the 1928 Summer Olympics
Fencers at the 1932 Summer Olympics
Fencers at the 1936 Summer Olympics
Olympic bronze medalists for Poland
Olympic medalists in fencing
Medalists at the 1928 Summer Olympics
Medalists at the 1932 Summer Olympics
19th-century Polish people
20th-century Polish people
Sportspeople from Bydgoszcz